George Godfrey Massy Wheeler, VC (31 January 1873 – 13 April 1915) was a British Army officer, and a recipient of the Victoria Cross, the highest and most prestigious award for gallantry in the face of the enemy that can be awarded to British and Commonwealth forces.

Background and family
Wheeler was a grandson of Sir Hugh Massy Wheeler. He was educated at Bedford Modern School. In 1900 he married Nellie Purcell, a daughter of the surgeon Ferdinand Purcell.

Military career
Wheeler was commissioned a second lieutenant in the Wiltshire Regiment on 20 May 1893, and was promoted to lieutenant on 1 April 1895. He transferred to the Indian Staff Corps where he was attached to the 7th Bengal Lancers, stationed at Faizabad. Appointed adjutant of the regiment on 25 October 1901, he was promoted to captain on 20 May 1902.

Victoria Cross
He was Major in the 7th Hariana Lancers, British Indian Army, during World War I. On 12 April 1915 at Shaiba, Mesopotamia, Major Wheeler led his squadron in an attempt to capture a flag which was the centre-point of a group of the enemy who were firing on one of his troop's picquets. He advanced, attacked the enemy's infantry with the lance, and then retired while the enemy swarmed out of hidden ground where Royal Artillery guns could attack them. On 13 April Major Wheeler led his squadron to the attack of the North Mound. He was seen far ahead of his men, riding straight for the enemy's standards, but was killed in the attack. Major Wheeler was 42 years old at the time of this action, for which he was awarded the VC.

References

Monuments to Courage (David Harvey, 1999)
The Register of the Victoria Cross (This England, 1997)

1873 births
1915 deaths
British World War I recipients of the Victoria Cross
British Indian Army officers
Graduates of the Royal Military College, Sandhurst
Indian Army personnel killed in World War I
Indian Staff Corps officers
Wiltshire Regiment officers
People educated at Bedford Modern School
Burials at Basra War Cemetery
Military personnel of British India